The Korg OASYS PCI is a DSP-based PCI-card for PC and Mac released in 1999. It offers many synthesizer engines from sampling and substractive to FM and physical modelling.
Because of its high market price and low polyphony, production was stopped in 2001.
About 2000 cards were produced.

Engines 
Some of the models were taken from Korg Z1 hardware synthesizer.

ROMpler

Virtual Analog 
 Analog 1 Osc - basic analog synthesizer with one oscillator;
 Analog 2 Osc - same as previous, but with two oscillator. Consume less DSP-power than two copy of Analog 1 Osc;
 Analog Bass-Lead - simple synthesizer dedicated for solo and bass sounds;
 Comb Synth - same as previous, but with comb filter;
 KB-303 - model of Roland TB-303 bass synthesizer;
 Mini Synth - model of Minimoog synthesizer;
 Noise Synth - noise synth for percussion sounds and effects;
 Pro Synth - model of Sequential Circuits Prophet-5 synthesizer;
 Pro Synth Mod - same as previous with two more envelope generators and control elements.

Physical modelling 
 Reed Piano - model of popular e-piano;
 Plucked String - acoustic guitar and other plucked string instrument model;
 Small Plucked String - lite version of previous mode. Consume less DSP power;
 Slap Bass - bass guitar model;
 Small Slap Bass - lite version of previous mode. Consume less DSP power;
 Tonewheel Organ - electric organ model.
 Z1 Organ - model taken from Korg Z1. Sounds pretty the same;
 Tenor Sax - physical model of Saxophone.

Drum Synthesizer 
 Percussion Synth - drum machine similar to Korg Electribe R.
 Percussion Synth 2 - same as previous with one more envelope generators;
 Beat Box - 3-track drum machine with 16-step sequencer and two Percussion Synth 2.

Virtual Phase Modulation (Frequency modulation) 
 VPM 2 OP - 2-op FM synth with one ADSR envelope;
 VPM 4 OP - 4-op FM synth;
 VPM 4 OP Select - 4-op FM synth with 8 algorithms of operators connection. Specification close to Yamaha TX81Z and FB-01.

Effects 
Card comes with basic effects package based on 17 categories. Many of them taken from Korg Trinity workstation synthesizer.

Extensions 
Korg released Synth Kit software for Mac OS 9 for extensions developing. Some of addition plugins were released to expand card capabilities:
 Harm Visser (acoustic modelling instruments)
 Dan Philips (effects and tools)
 Orwell Digital (VA and percussion synthesizer)
 Zarg Music (Orion synthesizer)

Compatibility 
Because of fast market fail, no drivers were released for (then) modern operation systems including Windows XP and Mac OS X. Most of users had to have dedicated computer for Korg Oasys PCI on Windows ME/98.

Successor 
The Korg OASYS workstation synthesizer released in early 2005.

See also 
 Creamware
 Korg OASYS
 Korg Prophecy
 Korg Trinity
 Korg Triton
 Korg Z1

Bibliography 
  (see also a column on this article: "Native Vs DSP: Dan Phillips (Korg R&D) On Processing Power")

Z
Sound cards